The black-throated whipbird (Psophodes nigrogularis) is a passerine bird found in several scattered populations in Southwest Australia.  It is predominantly olive green in colour. It was formerly considered to be conspecific with the white-bellied whipbird (Psophodes leucogaster), so shares the common name "western whipbird".

Taxonomy
The black-throated whipbird was described by the English ornithologist John Gould in 1844 and given its current binomial name Psophodes nigrogularis.

Two subspecies are recognised. Both are under threat to some degree.
Psophodes nigrogularis nigrogularis: (Endangered) The western heath subspecies is now restricted to a small patch east of Albany, having disappeared from large parts of its range due to land clearance.
P. n. oberon: (Rare) The western mallee subspecies is found in scattered populations between the Stirling Ranges and Ravensthorpe. It is apparently common in the Fitzgerald River National Park.

The white-bellied whipbird (Psophodes leucogaster) was formerly treated as conspecific with the black-throated whipbird. It was promoted to species status based on an analysis of mitochondrial DNA sequences published in 2017. The Clements Checklist refers to this species with the common name western whipbird (black-throated) to distinguish it from P. leucogaster (white-bellied).

Description
It is predominantly olive green with a black throat and a narrow white cheek-patch edged with black on its face. It has a small crest and a long dark olive-green tail tipped with white, its underparts are a paler olive colour. The bill is black with blackish feet. Juveniles are a duller olive-brown in colour and lack the white cheek stripes and dark throat.

Breeding
Breeding occurs in spring.

References

Sources
 Garnett, S. (1993) Threatened and Extinct Birds Of Australia. Royal Australasian Ornithologists Union. National Library, Canberra. 

black-throated whipbird
Endemic birds of Southwest Australia
Vulnerable fauna of Australia
black-throated whipbird